Psudocalamobius is a genus of beetles in the family Cerambycidae, containing the following species:

 Psudocalamobius incertus Breuning, 1940
 Psudocalamobius japonicus (Bates, 1873)
 Psudocalamobius leptissimus
 Psudocalamobius montanus Hayashi, 1959

References

Agapanthiini